Seydou Koné (born 28 March 1983) is a Ivorian former professional footballer who played as a striker.

Career
Born in Abidjan, Ivory Coast, Koné played youth football in his native country before starting his senior career in Burkina Faso with Racing Club Kadiogo, where he spent five seasons. After spells in Romania with FC Botoșani and FC Internațional Curtea de Argeș, he moved to Portugal in 2009 to join União Leiria. Koné made just one appearance for the club before transferring to French side Pau FC the following summer. He signed a two-year contract with Nîmes in 2011 after spending one season with Pau and leading the Championnat de France amateur in goals.

Koné spent two years with Nîmes before transferring to ES Uzès Pont du Gard ahead of the 2013–14 season, and six months later he was on the move again, joining FC Istres.

Career statistics

References

External links
 
 

1983 births
Living people
Footballers from Abidjan
Ivorian footballers
Association football forwards
Ivorian expatriate footballers
Ivorian expatriate sportspeople in Romania
Expatriate footballers in Romania
Ivorian expatriate sportspeople in Portugal
Expatriate footballers in Portugal
Ivorian expatriate sportspeople in France
Expatriate footballers in France
FC Botoșani players
U.D. Leiria players
Pau FC players
Nîmes Olympique players
ES Uzès Pont du Gard players
FC Istres players
Chamois Niortais F.C. players
Stade Lavallois players
Primeira Liga players
Ligue 2 players
Championnat National players
Championnat National 2 players